Igor Schiavetti (born 23 January 1976) is an Italian baseball player who competed in the 2004 Summer Olympics.

References

1976 births
Living people
Olympic baseball players of Italy
Baseball players at the 2004 Summer Olympics
Nettuno Baseball Club players